Whom the Gods Destroy is a 1934 American drama film directed by Walter Lang and starring Walter Connolly.

Cast
 Walter Connolly as John Forrester a.k.a. Eric Jann a.k.a. Peter Korotoff
 Robert Young as Jack Forrester
 Doris Kenyon as Margaret Forrester
 Macon Jones as Jack Forrester (aged 14)
 Scotty Beckett as Jack Forrester (age 4; credited as Scott Beckett)
 Rollo Lloyd as Henry Braverman
 Maidel Turner as Henrietta Crosland
 Henry Kolker as Carlo - the Puppeteer
 George Humbert as Niccoli
 Hugh Huntley as Jamison - Ship's Officer
 Hobart Bosworth as Alec Klein
 Gilbert Emery as Professor Weaver
 Akim Tamiroff as Peter Korotoff

References

External links
 

1934 films
1934 drama films
American drama films
American black-and-white films
Columbia Pictures films
Films directed by Walter Lang
Films with screenplays by Sidney Buchman
1930s English-language films
1930s American films